Miller Creek is a stream in the U.S. state of West Virginia. It is a tributary of Tug Fork.

Miller Creek most likely derives its name from Emile Millard, a pioneer settler.

See also
List of rivers of West Virginia

References

Rivers of Mingo County, West Virginia
Rivers of West Virginia